Joseph M. Gregory (born 29 February 1952) is a US banker and held the last President/COO position of investment bank Lehman Brothers Holdings Inc before their bankruptcy in September 2008. After working for Lehman for 30 years, not much news has emanated about any new business activities as of 2018.

References

Living people
1952 births
Investment bankers
Lehman Brothers people